The 2009 Fifth Third Bank Tennis Championships was a professional tennis tournament played on Hard court. It was a sixteenth edition of the tournament which was part of the 2009 ATP Challenger Tour. It took place in Lexington, Kentucky, United States between 20 and 26 July 2009.

ATP entrants

Seeds

 Rankings are as of July 13, 2009.

Other entrants
The following players received wildcards into the singles main draw:
  Bruno Agostinelli
  Jordan Cox
  Ryan Harrison
  Denis Kudla

The following players received entry from the qualifying draw:
  Austin Krajicek
  Alex Kuznetsov
  Tennys Sandgren 
  Tim Smyczek

Champions

Singles

 Harel Levy def.  Alex Kuznetsov, 6–4, 4–6, 6–2

Doubles

 Kevin Anderson /  Ryler DeHeart def.  Amir Hadad /  Harel Levy, 6–4, 4–6, [10–6]

References
Official website
ITF Search 
2009 Draws

Fifth Third Bank Tennis Championships
2009